Xavier Dorfman (born 12 May 1973 in Grenoble) is a French competition rower and Olympic champion.

Dorfman won a gold medal in the lightweight coxless fours, at the 2000 Summer Olympics. He is married to fellow rower Bénédicte Dorfman-Luzuy.

References

Living people
1973 births
French male rowers
Olympic rowers of France
Rowers at the 1996 Summer Olympics
Rowers at the 2000 Summer Olympics
Olympic gold medalists for France
Olympic medalists in rowing
Sportspeople from Grenoble
Medalists at the 2000 Summer Olympics
World Rowing Championships medalists for France
21st-century French people